The Cooper T24 is a Formula 2 racing car, built, designed and developed by the British manufacturer Cooper Cars in 1953. It was used in Formula 2 racing between 1953 and 1960, and briefly used in Formula One racing, in 1953 and 1954. Based on the Cooper T23, the main difference was that it was powered by a 2.5-litre Alta L-4 engine that allowed for more streamlined bodywork.

Formula One World Championship results
(key) (results in bold indicate pole position; results in italics indicate fastest lap)

References

Cooper racing cars
Formula Two cars